is a Japanese actress, model and former gravure idol. She is represented by Tommy's Artist Company.

Roles

TV Dramas 
2019: Kamen Rider Zi-O (Yuko Kitajima/Another Kiva; Episode 35-36, 2019)
2014: Lost Days no Himitsu (Fuji Television)
2014: Nezumi, Edo Runs (NHK; Episode 2, January 16, 2014)
2014: Blood Rut (WoWoW)
2013: Doctor X (TV Asahi; Episode 4, November 11, 2013)
2013: Apoyan～The Running International Airport (Tokyo Broadcasting; Episode 8, March 7, 2013)
2013: Kodomo Police Superintendent (MBS/TBS (Tokyo Broadcasting))
2012: Maguma (WoWoW)
2012: Lucky Seven (Fuji Television; Episode 8, March 5, 2012)
2012: Detective Suzuki Kurokawa (Yomiuri Television with NTV; Episode 1, January 5, 2012)
2011: The Solution After Dinner (Fuji Television; Episode 2, October 25, 2011)
2011: BOSS 2 (Fuji Television; Episode 1-2, April 14, 2011)
2011: The Secret Agency of Edo (aka: The Secret 808 Agency) (NHK; 9 episodes; January 8, 2011 - March 26, 2011)
2011: Indictment~Court Appointed Attorney (TV Asahi; Episodes 1-2,7-8; January 2011)
2010: Mori no Asagao (Tokyo TV; Episode 4, 5)
2010: Divorce Syndrome (NHK special, June 30, 2010)
2009: Very Strange Tale 2009 (Autumn special 80th episode, Title: "Judgment Curse")
2009: LOVE GAME
2009: Marriage Cutlet
2009: Why Women Marry With Distinct Blood Types (Episode Type B)
2009: SmaSTATION (segment only): Kamen Rider G
2008: The Glory of Team Batista (Team Batista no Eiko)
2008: Seven Women Lawyers (Series 2)
2008: The Flower Shop Without Roses (Bara no nai Hanaya)
2007: Galileo (Episode 8)
2007: Hanazono's Secret
2006: Seven Women Lawyers (Series 1)
2005: Kiken na Aneki
2004: Kurokawa no Techou
2004: Sky High 2
2003: Sky High
2003: Stand Up!!
2002: Ikiru Tame no Jonetsu Toshite no Satsujin

Movies 
2021: Iké Boys
2020: Hall
2014: Aibou: The Movie III (April 28, 2014)
2013: Tiger Mask (The Movie)
2012: Little Maestra
2010: Saraba Itoshi no Daitouriyou
2008: Sushi Prince! Goes to New York
2005: Henshin
2003: Sky High
2003: Godzilla: Tokyo S.O.S. (Gojira × Mosura × Mekagojira - Toukyou S.O.S.)
2002: Godzilla Against Mechagodzilla (Gojira tai Mekagojira)
2001: The Princess Blade (Shurayukihime)

 Books (as author) 
2013: [Shaku Body] (Publisher: Gakken Publishing)
2012: [I am] (Publisher: Gakken Publishing)
2010: Shaku Beauty-Style (Publisher: Gakken Publishing)
2009: Shaku Beauty (Publisher: Wani Books)

 Other 
2013: Put Into Practice - Japan's Top 100 Mountains (NHK/BS-1; Host))
2013: High Leg Panda (NHK; voice of High Leg Panda)
2003–2007: Eigo de Shabera Night (NHK)
2006: 009-1 (voice of Mylene Hoffman (code name: 009-1))
2005: Perfect Dark Zero (voice of Joanna Dark)
2004: Lara Croft: Tomb Raider (Japanese dubbed voice of Angelina Jolie's character, Lara Croft, on Fuji Television broadcast version only)
2003: Mobile Suit Gundam: Encounters In Space (voice of Miyu Takizawa)
1999: Parasite Eve II'' (voice of Aya Brea)

References

External links 
Official profile at Tommy's Artist Company 
Official blog 

1978 births
Living people
Voice actresses from Tokyo Metropolis
Actresses from Tokyo
Japanese female models
Japanese film actresses
Japanese television actresses
Japanese television personalities
Japanese video game actresses
Japanese voice actresses
People from Kiyose, Tokyo
20th-century Japanese actresses
21st-century Japanese actresses